Elbe Canal may refer to:
 Elbe–Havel Canal, between the Elbe and the Havel
 Elbe Lateral Canal, between the Elbe and the Mittelland Canal
 Elbe–Lübeck Canal, between the Elbe and the Trave
 Elbe-Weser Waterway, between the Elbe and the Weser